Otto Illies (25 January 1881, Yokohama - 22 February 1959, Wernigerode) was a German Expressionist landscape painter.

Biography 
His father was the overseas merchant, a pioneer in German-Japanese trade. He spent part of his childhood there, then was returned to Germany to attend school; first in Blankenese and later in the countryside in Schleswig-Holstein. After that, he took courses in art history at the Ludwig Maximilian University of Munich and attended classes in nude painting led by Heinrich Knirr.

From 1903 to 1908, he took further classes in nude painting from Ludwig von Hofmann (who later became a friend and supporter) at the Grand-Ducal Saxon Art School, Weimar. It was there he came into contact with Neoimpressionism but, after experimenting with that style, turned decisively away from it. After completing his classes, he exhibited with the Berlin Secession and established a studio community with his former classmate from Munich, Hans Delbrück.

In 1910, both of his parents died, leaving him a considerable fortune. The following year, he used some of it to build a villa in Falkenstein (an outlying district of Hamburg), designed by the architect, Walther Baedeker (1880-1959), where he established his studio. In 1924, he relocated to Wernigerode, in Harz, where he died in 1959.

He was primarily known as a landscape painter, with a special focus on fruit trees, although he also painted quarries and pinges. His next most numerous works involved flowers and interiors. On the 50th anniversary of his death, in 2009, the Gleimhaus in Halberstadt, which maintains a large part of his estate, held a major retrospective.

Further reading 
 Maria Dietl (Ed.): Otto Illies: 1881-1959. Gemälde, Pastelle, Graphik. Exhibition catalog, Galerie im Gutshaus Großjena bei Naumburg an der Saale, 1995
 Reimar F. Lacher: "Schenkung Otto Illies". In: Gemeinnützige Blätter. Der Förderkreis Gleimhaus e. V. berichtet und informiert, #17. 2008, pgs.65–67
 Farben-Schöpfung. Otto Illies (1881–1959), Yokohama, Hamburg, Wernigerode. Exhibition catalog, Gleimhaus Halberstadt, 2009, Edited by Reimar F. Lacher, with contributions from Rita Kayser and Heike Billerbeck

External links 
 
 Short biography and paintings @ the Galerie Herold
 More works by Illies @ ArtNet
 Works by Illies @ museum-digital.de

1881 births
1959 deaths
20th-century German painters
20th-century German male artists
German landscape painters
German Expressionist painters
People from Yokohama